Vilyuysk (Bülüü) is a town and the administrative center of Vilyuysky District in the Sakha Republic, Russia, located on the Vilyuy River (left tributary of the Lena), about  from Yakutsk, the capital of the republic. As of the 2010 Census, its population was 10,234.

History
The first permanent settlement on the site of the present town was a Cossack winter settlement founded in 1634 as Tyukanskoye or Verkhnevilyuyskoye.

Members of the peasant rebellion led by Yemelyan Pugachev were exiled to the area in the 1770s, building the new town of Olensk in 1783. The town's name was derived from the Russian word "" (olen), meaning "stag", as still seen in the town's symbols. The town was renamed Vilyuysk after the river on which it stands in 1821.

Kate Marsden visited in 1891 on her mission to treat lepers in the region, and returned in 1897 to establish a hospital.

Administrative and municipal status
Within the framework of administrative divisions, Vilyuysk serves as the administrative center of Vilyuysky District. As an inhabited locality, Vilyuysk is classified as a town under district jurisdiction. As an administrative division, it is, together with one rural locality (the selo of Sosnovka), incorporated within Vilyuysky District as the Town of Vilyuysk. As a municipal division, the Town of Vilyuysk is incorporated within Vilyuysky Municipal District as Vilyuysk Urban Settlement.

Transportation
The Vilyuysk Airport is located near the town.

Climate
Vilyuysk has an extremely continental subarctic climate (Köppen climate classification Dfc). Precipitation is quite low, but is significantly higher in summer than at other times of the year.

Naming honors
The minor planet 2890 Vilyujsk, discovered in 1978 by Soviet astronomer Lyudmila Zhuravlyova, is named after the town.

References

Notes

Sources
Official website of the Sakha Republic. Registry of the Administrative-Territorial Divisions of the Sakha Republic. Vilyuysky District. 

Cities and towns in the Sakha Republic